Parc de la Vérendrye (Le Domaine) Water Aerodrome, formerly , was located on Lac Jean-Péré, Quebec, Canada. It was open from June until October.

References

Defunct seaplane bases in Quebec